The Revista Latinoamericana de Química is a Mexican scientific journal in chemistry. The first issue was published in 1970 and the journal appeared irregular thereafter.

Chemistry journals
Publications established in 1970